The Ali Ili were one of the ten major tribal divisions in Turkmenistan.  Prior to the rise of the Soviet Union, they considered themselves to be a distinct ethnic group.  However, the Soviets pressured them into the category of Turkmen.

References
Wixman, Ronald. The Peoples of the USSR: An Ethnographic Handbook. (Armonk, New York: M. E. Sharpe, Inc, 1984) p. 9
Olson, James S., An Ethnohistorical Dictionary of the Russian and Soviet Empires. (Westport: Greenwood Press, 1994) p. 31

Ethnic groups in Turkmenistan